Ștefan Holban (15 May 1869 — 2 December 1939) was a Romanian general and politician who participated in the Hungarian–Romanian War against the Bolshevik regime of Béla Kun in Hungary in 1919 and served as Minister of War from 1921—1922.

Biography
Born in Vaslui, he graduated in 1889 from the School of Cavalry Officers, advancing in 1898 to the rank of captain. Between 1898 and 1900, he studied at the Higher War School. His daughter, was born in 1901 and later became a noted historian.

He was promoted to the rank of colonel in 1914.  In October 1916, after Romania entered World War I on the side of the Allies, he took command of the 9th and 19th Divisions of the Romanian Army. In 1917, he was promoted to the rank of brigadier general.

In June 1918, Holban was appointed commander of the 6th Division, which entered Transylvania at the end of 1918. On April 20, 1919, he marched into Oradea, together with General Traian Moșoiu (the commander of the Romanian Army Group North) and Colonel . On August 4, 1919, when the Romanian troops under the overall command of General Gheorghe Mărdărescu entered Budapest, Holban was appointed military governor of the city. As governor, he approved the freeing of prisoners detained by the communist regime at the Rákospalota camp and in other prisons, as well as the return of property confiscated by the Hungarian Soviet Republic.

In 1921, he was promoted to the rank of division general. He served as Minister of War in the Take Ionescu cabinet from 17 December 1921 to 19 January 1922. 

He died in Bucharest in 1939. A street in Sector 1 of the capital city is named after him. A high school in Cărpineni, Moldova also bears his name.

Bibliography

References

1869 births
1939 deaths
People from Vaslui
Romanian Army World War I generals
Romanian Land Forces generals
Romanian people of the Hungarian–Romanian War
Romanian Ministers of Defence
Carol I National Defence University alumni